The second government of Francina Armengol was formed on 3 July 2019, following the latter's election as President of the Balearic Islands by the Parliament of the Balearic Islands on 27 June and her swearing-in on 1 July, as a result of the Socialist Party of the Balearic Islands (PSIB–PSOE) emerging as the largest parliamentary force at the 2019 regional election.

The cabinet comprises members of the PSIB–PSOE, Unidas Podemos and More for Mallorca (Més), as well as a number of independents proposed by the first two parties. The government agreements resulting from the government formation negotiations were dubbed as the "Bellver Agreements", as they were signed in the Bellver Castle. The government received the external support of left-wing More for Menorca (MxMe) and People for Formentera (GxF), along with the abstention of centre regionalist Proposal for the Isles (El Pi). The right-of-centre People's Party (PP), Citizens (Cs) and Vox opposed the formation of the government.

Investiture

Cabinet changes
Armengol's second government saw a number of cabinet changes during its tenure:
On 12 February 2021, Francina Armengol announced a cabinet reshuffle that saw the Energy Transition and Productive Sectors and Education, University and Research ministries reorganized into the Energy Transition, Productive Sectors and Democratic Memory and Education and Vocational Training portfolios, respectively; Pilar Costa resigning as Minister of Presidency, Culture and Equality to become spokesperson of the PSIB group in the Parliament of the Balearic Islands, with Mercedes Garrido replacing her in the new Presidency, Civil Service and Equality portfolio; Iago Negueruela assuming the competences of the Spokesperson of the Government; Josep Marí replacing Marc Pons as Mobility and Housing officeholder; and the creation of a new European Funds, University and Culture department under Miquel Company, following the disestablishment of the Public Administrations and Modernization ministry.

Council of Government
The Government of the Balearic Islands is structured into the offices for the president, the vice president, 11 ministries and the post of the spokesperson of the Government.

Departmental structure
Francina Armengol's second government is organised into several superior and governing units, whose number, powers and hierarchical structure may vary depending on the ministerial department.

Unit/body rank
() General secretary
() Director-general
() Temporary staff

Notes

References

2019 establishments in the Balearic Islands
Cabinets established in 2019
Cabinets of the Balearic Islands